Eltham is a district of southeast London, England, within the Royal Borough of Greenwich.

Eltham may also refer to:
Eltham, Alberta, Canada
Eltham, New Zealand, a small town in southern Taranaki, New Zealand.
Eltham, Victoria, a suburb of Melbourne, Victoria, Australia.
Eltham, Virginia, a small unincorporated community in New Kent County, Virginia, United States

See also

Eltham, London 
Eltham railway station
Mottingham railway station, a different railway station, south of Eltham in Mottingham that was previously named Eltham station.
Eltham (UK Parliament constituency), a borough constituency represented in the House of Commons of the Parliament of the UK.
Eltham Palace, a large house in Eltham, currently owned by English Heritage and open to the public.
Eltham Well Hall rail crash, a derailment on the British railway system 1972.
Eltham College, an independent school in Mottingham, south of Eltham.
Eltham ordinances, a set of reforms to the administration of Henry VIII of England's court.
John of Eltham, Earl of Cornwall John of Eltham, (1316–1336), son of Edward II of England and Isabella of France.
Earl of Eltham, a title that has been created twice as a subsidiary title.
New Eltham, a smaller district, previously called Pope Street, southeast of Eltham.
New Eltham railway station

Eltham, Victoria 
Eltham railway station, Melbourne
Electoral district of Eltham
Eltham Wildcats Basketball Club, the largest junior basketball club in the world.
Eltham Football Club
Eltham College of Education, a private high school, situated in Research, northeast of Eltham, Victoria.
Eltham High School
Eltham North, Victoria, a suburb of Melbourne, north of Eltham, Victoria.

Eltham, Virginia 
Battle of Eltham's Landing, an 1862 battle, part of the Peninsula Campaign of the American Civil War.